The following lists events that happened during 1953 in Cape Verde.

Incumbents
Colonial governor:
Carlos Alberto Garcia Alves Roçadas
Manuel Marques de Abrantes Amaral

Events

Sports
Académica do Mindelo won the first official Cape Verdean Football Championship

Births
Tchalé Figueira, artist
Ana Firmino, singer
May 21: Djô d'Eloy (d. 2005), singer
December 1: Georgina Mello, economist, director-general of CPLP

References

 
1953 in the Portuguese Empire
Years of the 20th century in Cape Verde
1950s in Cape Verde
Cape Verde
Cape Verde